The Lokundje is a river of southwestern Cameroon. It flows near Bipindi and Fifinda and the Ebea Falls. The river played a military role in the French battle against Germany during World War I.

References

Rivers of Cameroon
South Region (Cameroon)